The Doran JE4 is a first-generation Daytona Prototype race car chassis made by Doran Racing, that debuted in the 2003 Grand-American Rolex Sports Car Series. The car was powered by a number of engine manufacturers, including Chevrolet, Ford, Lexus, and Pontiac.

References

2000s cars
Mid-engined cars
Rear-wheel-drive vehicles
Sports prototypes